P3, P-3, P.3, or P03 may refer to:

Entertainment
 Persona 3, a 2006 video game
 Postal III, a 2011 video game
 Third (Portishead album), 2008 music album
 P3 Club, a fictional nightclub in the television series Charmed
 PartyNextDoor 3, an album by PartyNextDoor
 Periphery III: Select Difficulty, Periphery's fifth album, released in 2016.

Radio stations
 DR P3, Denmark
 NRK P3, Norway
 Sveriges Radio P3, Sweden

Organizations
 P3 group (formerly also P3 Ingenieurgesellschaft), a defunct German engineering service provision company
 P3 art and environment, an arts organisation in Tokyo, Japan
 Polish Pirate Party, a political party in Poland based on the model of the Swedish Pirate Party

 P3 International, the maker of Kill A Watt electricity usage meters
 P3 America, Britain and France as nuclear powers

Science and technology
 P3 laboratory, biosafety-level-3 laboratory
 ATC code P03 Ectoparasiticides, including scabicides, insecticides and repellents, a subgroup of the Anatomical Therapeutic Chemical Classification System
 Honda P3, a robot
 P3, successor to the Rega Planar 3 LP record player
 P300 (neuroscience) or P3, a neural evoked potential component of the electroencephalogram (EEG)
 Pentax P3, a camera model
 Period 3, a row of the periodic table of elements
 Pioneer P-3, an intended lunar orbiter probe
 Primavera (software), or Primavera Project Planner, a project management software package
 Sony Cyber-shot DSC-P3, a Sony Cyber-shot camera
 SARS-CoV-2 Theta variant, one of the variants of SARS-CoV-2, the virus that causes COVID-19

Computing
 Pentium III, a brand of microprocessors
 Intel 80386, the third processor in the x86 line
 DCI-P3, a color space used for some monitors and projectors

Transportation
 Alfa Romeo P3, a racing car
 NER Class P3, a locomotive
 P3 (AirTrain Newark station), a US station
 P3, a national road in Latvia
 Volvo P3 platform, an automobile platform

Aviation
 Curtiss P-3 Hawk, an American fighter aircraft of the 1920s
 Lockheed P-3 Orion, an American maritime patrol aircraft
 Piaggio P.3, an Italian night bomber prototype of the 1920s
 Pilatus P-3, a Swiss military training aircraft of the 1950s
 Cochise College Airport (FAA LID)

Other uses
 Public–private partnership, a type of business venture